Oh My God (also known as The Baby from the Universe and Children Fallen from the Skies) is a 2015 Chinese romantic comedy science fiction film directed by Wei Nan and Wei Min and produced by Zhang Ziyi. The film stars Lay Zhang, Li Xiaolu, Cheney Chen and Coco Jiang Wen.

Plot
The movie tells the story of a couple who fervently prayed for a blessing. In answer to their earnest request, the heavens gifted them with a child. From then on, the new family of two couples traverses the happy and sad paths of life.

Chen Mo and Mo Han, Le Yi and Mega are a pair of couples which are close friends. The four young people live together in the same residence and lead a nonchalant and carefree life. Suddenly on one faithful day, a meteor crashed onto their rooftop which morphed into a lovely baby which came to them in their sleep. Astonished about the overnight presence, the four were rendered perplexed. The four soon became baby sitters and were the frenzied by the task. Gradually they found this "everyone's" baby possesses magical powers! Followed by a string of events, they were matured by the responsibilities and fostering of the baby.

Cast
 Zhang Yixing as Le Yi
 Li Xiaolu as Lu Miga
 Cheney Chen as Chen Mo
 Coco Jiang Wen as Mohan
 Zhang Ziyi as herself

Soundtrack 

The song was sung by Lay, Li Xiaolu and Coco Jiang Wen.

Release and reception

Box office 
The film grossed CN¥56 million at the Chinese box office.

Accolades

Critical response 
There were mixed opinions about the film. The film garnered substantial reviews that questioned the overall logicality and the abrupt ending. However, actor Chen Xuedong was still praised by netizens for their improved acting skills and the plot of man baby-sitting infants with highlights on responsibility and family life.

Ratings 
The movie garnered a 7.6/10 rating and 31,877,503 viewers on Youku. Mtime rated the movie at 5.0/10.

Promotion

Premiere 
On August 4, a pre-release premiere was held to introduce the cast and announce the prospects of the film. Two subsequent premieres were held at Beijing on November 3 and December 1.

Music Video 
A music video featuring the singers of the theme song, Zhang Yixing (Lay), Li Xiaolu and Coco Jiang Wen was dropped one day before the release of the film. The song was composed by Zhang Yixing himself.

References

2015 romantic comedy films
Chinese romantic comedy films
2010s Mandarin-language films